Miles Libellula refers to two aircraft designs

Miles M.35 Libellula, experimental tandem wing fighter design
Miles M.39B Libellula, scaled experimental tandem wing bomber design